The 2005 Euroleague Final Four was the concluding Euroleague Final Four tournament of the 2004–05 Euroleague season. The tournament was held on May 6 and on May 8, 2005. The event was held at Olimpiisky Arena in Moscow, Russia.

Bracket

Semifinals

Third place game

Final

Awards

Euroleague Final Four MVP 
  Šarūnas Jasikevičius ( Maccabi Tel Aviv)

Euroleague Finals Top Scorer 
  Šarūnas Jasikevičius ( Maccabi Tel Aviv)

External links 
 2005 Final Four website

Final Four
2003–04
2004–05 in Israeli basketball
2004–05 in Russian basketball
2004–05 in Spanish basketball
2004–05 in Greek basketball
International basketball competitions hosted by Russia
Sports competitions in Moscow